Tughluqabad Fort is a ruined fort in Delhi, India built by Ghiyasuddin Tughluq, the founder of the Tughlaq dynasty, of the Delhi Sultanate  of India in 1321, as he established the third historic city of Delhi, which was later abandoned in 1327. It lends its name to the nearby Tughluqabad residential-commercial area as well as the Tughluqabad Institutional Area. Ghiyasuddin Tughluq also built the Qutub-Badarpur Road, which connected the new city to the Grand Trunk Road. The road is now known as Mehrauli-Badarpur Road. The entry fee for the Fort is Rs. 20 for Indians. Also, nearby is Dr. Karni Singh Shooting Range and Okhla Industrial Area.

Surroundings are an important biodiversity area within the Northern Aravalli leopard wildlife corridor stretching from Sariska Tiger Reserve to Delhi. It is contiguous to the seasonal waterfalls in Pali-Dhuaj-Kot villages of Faridabad, the sacred Mangar Bani and the Asola Bhatti Wildlife Sanctuary. There are several dozen lakes formed in the abandoned open pit mines in the forested hilly area of Delhi Ridge.

History 

Ghazi Malik was a feudatory of the Khalji rulers of Delhi, India. The Khaliji dynasty is a Turco-Afghan dynasty which ruled India. Once, while on a walk with his Khalji master, Ghazi Malik suggested that the king build a fort on a hillock in the southern portion of Delhi. The king jokingly told Ghazi Malik to build the fort himself when he would become king.

In 1321, Ghazi Malik drove away the Khaljis and assumed the title of Ghias-ud-din Tughlaq, starting the Tughlaq dynasty. He immediately started the construction of his fabled city, which he dreamt of as an impregnable, yet beautiful fort to keep away the Mongol marauders. However, destiny would not be as he would have liked.

The Curse of Nizamuddin Auliya 
Ghias-ud-din is usually perceived as a liberal ruler. However, he was so passionate about his dream fort that he issued a dictate that all labourers in Delhi must work on his fort. Saint Nizamuddin Auliya, a Sufi saint in the 13th century, got incensed as the work on his baoli (well) was stopped. The confrontation between the Sufi saint and the royal emperor has become a legend in India. The saint uttered a curse which was to resonate throughout history until today.

The Death of the ruler 
Another of the saint's curses was Hunuz Dilli door ast (Delhi is still far away). The Emperor was engrossed in a campaign in Bengal at this time. He was successful and was on his way to Delhi. However, his son, Muhammad bin Tughlaq, met him at Kara in Uttar Pradesh. Allegedly at the prince's orders, a Shamiana (Tent) was made to fall on the Emperor, who was crushed to death (1324).

Mausoleum of Ghiyas ud-Din Tughluq 

The 'Mausoleum of Ghiyath al-Din Tughluq' is connected by a causeway to the southern outpost of the fortification. This elevated causeway  in length, supported by 27 arches, leads across a former artificial lake, however sometime in 20th century portion of causeway was pierced by the Mehrauli-Badarpur road. After passing an old Pipal tree, the complex of Ghiyas ud-din Tughluq's tomb is entered by a high gateway made up of red sandstone with a flight of steps.

In contrast to the walls of the fortification made up of granite, the sides of the mausoleum are faced by smooth red sandstone and inlaid with inscribed panels and arch borders from marble. The edifice is topped by an elegant dome resting on an octagonal drum that is covered with white slabs of marble and slate.

Inside the mausoleum are three graves: The central one belongs to Ghiyas ud-din Tughluq and the other two are believed to be those of his wife and his son and successor Muhammad bin Tughluq. In the north-western bastion of the enclosure wall with its pillared corridors is another octagonal tomb in a similar style with a smaller marble dome and inscribed marble and sandstone slabs over its arched doors. According to an inscription over its southern entrance this tomb houses the remains of Zafar Khan. His grave was at the site prior to the construction of the outpost and was consciously integrated into the design of the mausoleum by Ghiyath al-Din himself.

Architecture 
Tughluqabad still consists of remarkable, massive stone fortifications that surround the irregular ground plan of the city. The city is supposed to once have had as many as 52 gates of which only 13 remain today. The fortified city contained seven rainwater tanks.

Tughluqabad is divided into three parts:
 the wider city area with houses built along a rectangular grid between its gates
 the citadel with a tower at its highest point known as Bijai-Mandal and the remains of several halls and a long underground passage
 the adjacent palace area containing the royal residences. A long underground passage below the tower still remains.

Today most of the city is inaccessible due to dense thorny vegetation. An ever increasing part of the former city area is occupied by modern settlement, especially in the vicinity of its lakes.

South of Tughlaqabad was a vast artificial water reservoir within the fortified outpost of Ghiyath al-Din Tughluq's Tomb. This well preserved mausoleum remains connected to the fort by an elevated causeway that still stands today.

Visible to the southeast are the remains of the Fortress of Adilabad, built years later by Ghiyathu'd-Din's successor, Muhammad Tughluq (1325–1351) which shares the main characteristics of construction with Tughlaqabad fort.

Gallery

See also 
History of Delhi

References 

Buildings and structures completed in 1321
Forts in Delhi
Architecture of the Tughlaq dynasty
Archaeological monuments in Delhi
Monuments of National Importance in Delhi